Maroons is an album by pianist Geri Allen recorded in 1992 and released on the Blue Note label.

Reception 

AllMusic awarded the album 4½ stars, stating, "This excellent recording is easily recommended to her fans and potential new devotees".

In an article for Jazz Times, Michael J. West praised "Number Four," writing that Allen "anticipates Belgrave's every melodic and rhythmic move—at times sticking-and-moving, a la Earl Hines with Armstrong. She picks up his pathways on her solo... but turns them in her own direction, as if his improvised figures were the written material on which she was improvising. It's a remarkable achievement, one deserving of close attention within her catalogue."

Track listing
All compositions by Geri Allen except as indicated
 "Feed the Fire I" - 1:33	
 "No More Mr. Nice Guy" - 7:05	
 "And They Partied" - 5:29	
 "Number Four" (Lawrence Williams) - 4:35	
 "A Prayer for Peace" - 5:43	
 "Mad Money" - 7:39	
 "Two Brothers" (Anthony Cox, Dwayne Dolphin) - 2:49	
 "Feed the Fire II" - 3:29	
 "Dolphy's Dance" - 5:01	
 "For John Malachi" - 4:09	
 "Laila's House" - 8:21	
 "Feed the Fire III" - 3:16	
 "Brooklyn Bound "A"" - 1:05	
 "Bed-Sty" - 5:19	
 "Maroons" - 6:26

Personnel 
Geri Allen - piano
Marcus Belgrave, Wallace Roney - trumpet
Anthony Cox, Dwayne Dolphin - bass 
Pheeroan akLaff, Tani Tabbal - drums

References 

1992 albums
Geri Allen albums
Blue Note Records albums
Instrumental albums